The Columbus County Courthouse is a historic courthouse building located in Whiteville, Columbus County, North Carolina, USA. The two-story Classical Revival style building was designed by Joseph F. Leitner's firm, and built in 1914–1915.  It is a rectangular brick and concrete building and features a pedimented, tetrastyle Doric order portico.

It was listed on the National Register of Historic Places in 1979.

References

Government buildings completed in 1915
Neoclassical architecture in North Carolina
County courthouses in North Carolina
Courthouses on the National Register of Historic Places in North Carolina
Buildings and structures in Columbus County, North Carolina
National Register of Historic Places in Columbus County, North Carolina